This is a list of prefects of the Province of Pola (which consisted mostly of modern Istria County, in Croatia).

List

(Dates in italics indicate de facto continuation of office)

See also
Istria
History of Istria
Province of Pola
Istrian Italians

Pola
Pola,Prefects
Pola, Prefects
Pola, Prefects